The Israel men's national volleyball team represents Israel in international men's volleyball competitions and friendly matches. It is governed by the Israel Volleyball Association. Just like in other sports, even though Israel is geographically located in Asia, it competes in European competitions (CEV) due to the Arab boycott in the 1970s.

Results

World Championship

European Championship

European League

See also
Israel women's national volleyball team
Sport in Israel

External links
 Israel Volleyball Association

National men's volleyball teams
V
Volleyball in Israel
Men's sport in Israel